Nancy A. Collins is an American horror novelist and short-story writer. She has written over 20 novels.

Novels

Collections

As editor

References

Collins, Nancy A.
Collins, Nancy A.
Collins, Nancy A.